Rukmini Foundation is a Pittsburgh-based non-profit organization that raises funding for the education of underprivileged girls in Nepal.

Program
The Rukmini Foundation uses donations to fund school tuition, supplies, routine health check-ups and mentoring/tutoring services for underprivileged teenage girls living in Nepal.

References 

Child-related organisations in Nepal
2011 establishments in Nepal